India's Got Talent 9, is the ninth the Indian reality TV series India's Got Talent. It premiered from 15 January 2022 on Sony TV. Kirron Kher judging the show for the ninth time along with Manoj Muntashir, Shilpa Shetty and Badshah who are the judges of the season 9. This season will be hosted by Arjun Bijlani. Flute & beat-box duo Divyansh & Manuraj was announced as the winner on 17 April 2022.

Format
Auditions

The format of the show had changed, unlike the previous seasons. This year due to pandemic, 'Producer's Auditions' were cancelled and instead of that, 'Online Auditions' took place via Sony LIV app. A participant selected in online auditions perform infront of the judges.

Each participant that reaches this stage of auditions is held offstage from the main performing area in a waiting room, and given a number that denotes when they will perform. Upon being called before the judges, the participant is given 2-3 minutes to demonstrate their act, with a live audience present for all performances. Each judge is given a buzzer, and may use it during a performance if they are unimpressed, hate what is being performed, or feel the act is a waste of their time; if a participant is buzzed by all judges, their performance is automatically over. At the end of a performance, the judges give constructive criticism and feedback about what they saw, whereupon they each give a vote - a participant requires a majority vote approving their performance to proceed to the next stage, otherwise they are eliminated from the program at that stage. Many acts that move on may be cut by producers and may be forced to forfeit their place due to the limited slots available. Filming for each season always begins when the Judges' Auditions are taking place, with the show's presenter standing in the wings of each venue's stage to interview and give personal commentary on a participant's performance.

The Golden Buzzer returned for the fifth time. A judge can use golden buzzer in auditions twice, sending the acts directly to Top 14, escaping Judge Cuts. 
Judge Cuts

Quarter Finals

After auditions and judge cuts, six acts along with 8 golden buzzer acts compete in a weekly competition with act(s) eliminating each week till finale. There were wild cards also, Public gets to choose 1 wildcard out of judges cuts eliminated acts; where as judges choose 1 act from eliminated top 14 acts to compete in quarter-finals.

In Finals,  for the first time in Got talent history, "Golden Buzzer" was used as an appreciation key.

Season Overview 
Of the 53 selected participants that took part, only 14 (6 culling, 8 golden buzzers) made it past this stage in the quarter finals. In 8 quarter finals, with all contestants appearing in each one, eliminating 1 or 2 weekly in each; the wildcard act chosen by the judges was dance group Euphony', after they lost judges' vote in second quarter final; another wildcard act was chosen by the public using SonyLIV application on their phones. The following below lists the results of each participant's overall performance in this series:

 Winner |  Runner-up |  Third Place |  Finalist

 Semi-finalist |  Judges' Wildcard Quarter-finalist |  Public Wildcard Quarter-finalist  Golden Buzzer (Auditions)

 Golden Buzzer Summary Golden buzzer returned for its fifth series. This year the golden buzzer acts went straight to Top 14. In Finals, "Golden Buzzer" was used as an appreciation key. Grand Premiere (Ep. 9 - 10) Along with 8 Golden Buzzer Acts, 6 other Acts advanced to the Top 14.Guests: Symphony Legends Band (Lata Mangeshkar world tour team)               Suresh Mukund (Choreographer of  Kings United India & Winner of Season 3).

  Appreciation Golden Buzzer 
 Buzzed

 Quarter Finals Summary (Ep. 11 - 25) 
 Appreciation Golden Buzzer 
 Buzzed |  Judges' Vote
 Judges' Wild Card 
 Safe 
 Won Judges' Vote / Won More Votes (Safe)  
 Lost Judges' Vote / Won Less Votes (Eliminated)

 Quarter Final 1 (12-13 February) 
Guest: DharmendraThis episode featured 'The HE Man', Dharmendra, and so, was called, 'Dharmendra Ji Special'. All the Top 14 Quarter Finalists performed on his songs and requested the audience to vote for them at the end of their performances.

 Quarter Final 2 (19-20 February) 
Guest: Jackie ShroffThis episode featured 'Jackie Shroff ', and hence was called 'Jackie Shroff Special' The Top 14 quarter finalists performed and requested to vote. On 20th February, after all performed elimination took place in which 3 contestants with lowest votes were called and with an anonymous vote, judges chose to save one of them.''

 Received  from Jackie Shroff.
 Received  from Jackie Shroff.
 Received  from Kirron Kher & Jackie Shroff.

 Quarter Final 3 (26-27 February) 
Guests: Rohit Shetty (26 February) & The Fame Game Cast. (27 February)

 Received  from Shilpa Shetty. 
 Received  from Kirron Kher. 
 Received  from Badshah & Shilpa Shetty.
 Krish & Shalini were the Public Wildcard.
 Received  from Madhuri Dixit.

 Holi Special (Ep. 17 & 18) 
Guests: Govinda, Karishma Kapoor & Devi Sri Prasad

 Rishtey Special (Ep. 19) 
Guest Judge: Malaika Arora Khan (Replaced Shilpa)
Guests: Sikandar Kher (Kirron's Son), Prema Shukla (Manoj's Mother) & Tamanna Bhatia

 Bappi Da Special (Ep. 20) 
Guest Judge: Malaika Arora Khan (Replaced Shilpa)

Guests: Bappi Lahiri's Family 

 Attack Challenge (26 March) 
Guests: Attack Cast  (John Abraham, Jacqueline Fernandez & Rakul Preet Singh)

 India Special (27 March) 
Guests: Terence Lewis & Miss Universe 2021 Harnaaz Sandhu

 Dasvi Special (2 April) 
Guests: Dasvi Cast (Abhishek Bachchan, Nimrat Kaur and Yami Gautam)

 Jersey Special (3 April) 
Guests: Jersey Cast (Shahid Kapoor & Mrunal Thakur)

 Judges Special (9 April) 

 Finals Summary 

 Semi Finale (10 April) 
 Appreciation Golden Buzzer  Guest: Jubin Nautiyal Pre Finale (16 April) 
Pre-Finale episode had no judges. Bijli (Arjun Bijlani) & Julie (Sugandha Mishra) presented the show in a comedic way. The Top 7 finalists showcased their pre-recorded acts & were talked about the conditions when they returned to their hometown i.e. how people welcomed them. No voting took place in this episode.

Guest: Sugandha Mishra

 Grand Finale (17 April) 
 |  |  Guests:''' Heropanti 2 Cast, Superstar Singer 2 Cast and Sugandha Mishra.

Ratings

References 

Indian television series
Got Talent
2022 Indian television seasons
Sony Entertainment Television original programming